is the 13th single by Japanese entertainer Miho Nakayama. Written by Chinfa Kan and Cindy, the single was released on July 11, 1988, by King Records.

Background and release
"Mermaid" marked the beginning of Nakayama's collaboration with songwriters Kan and Cindy, which lasted until "Rosécolor" (though Cindy sporadically continued to co-write songs with Nakayama throughout the 1990s). The song was used as the opening theme of the TBS drama series , which starred Nakayama.

The jacket cover is a painting of Nakayama in a bikini by Robert Blue; this artwork was also used on her album Mind Game.

"Mermaid" became Nakayama's third consecutive No. 1 on Oricon's weekly singles chart and sold over 365,000 copies, becoming her biggest-selling single until "Tōi Machi no Doko ka de..." in 1991.

Track listing

Personnel
 Miho Nakayama – vocals
 Rod Antoon – keyboards, backing vocals (1)
 Takao Sugiyama – synthesizer, drum programming (2)
 Shinji Shiotsugu – guitar (1)
 Ichirō Hada – guitar (2)
 Kitarō – bass synthesizer (2)
 Cindy – backing vocals (1)
 Amazons – backing vocals (2)

Charts
Weekly charts

Year-end charts

References

External links

1988 singles
1988 songs
Japanese-language songs
Japanese television drama theme songs
Miho Nakayama songs
Songs with lyrics by Chinfa Kan
King Records (Japan) singles
Oricon Weekly number-one singles